Chockstone Pictures is an American independent film production company founded in 2004 by the husband-and-wife team of Steve and Paula Mae Schwartz. The company is headquartered in Malibu, California. The company produced the award-winning The Road as well as The Tree of Life and the upcoming Killing Them Softly.  Chockstone Pictures' founders also founded Schwartz Communications, a public relations agency.

References

External links 

Film production companies of the United States
American independent film studios